Irina Kaptelova is a Ukrainian actress. She's widely known for having played a number of roles in TV and movie industry of China.

Life and career
Kaptelova graduated from the Faculty of International Journalism at the Dnipropetrovsk National University in 2008, and then worked as a television host for a short term. She studied acting under Vitaly Malakhov, People's Artist of Ukraine, Taras Shevchenko National Award Laureate, Art director of Theatre on Podol. In 2012 she was admitted to the acting department in Russian Academy of Theatre Arts.

Her film debut was as a Russian military officer in Winter Is Not Cold (2009), which was later censored in China. After playing leading roles in several scripted series, she gained recognition for her performance in the drama My Natasha (2012).  Set in Northeast China and Soviet Union, My Natasha is an epic love story spanning 50 years.

It was the first foreign actress who played the female lead in the Chinese television series.  My Natasha became a success upon its release and launched Kaptelova on the path to stardom. Her performance won wide acclaim from film critics and the media, "She has created a unique image, playing with unique acting skills. 'My Natasha' made her the most brilliant star of Chinese screen". That same year, Kaptelova won the award of "Best Foreign Actress" at the 2012 TV Drama Awards Made in China.

In addition to Ukrainian and Russian, Kaptelova speaks English and Chinese. Now Kaptelova is involved in the filming of a new major series about Yung Wing, the first Chinese student in U.S. It is a joint Chinese-US project, and Kaptelova plays Yung Wing's American wife, Mary Kellogg.

Filmography

Film

Television

References

External links
 
 Irina Kaptelova on Weibo
 

1986 births
Living people
Ukrainian film actresses
Oles Honchar Dnipro National University alumni
Actors from Dnipro